Edgar Robinson Peña Parra (born 6 March 1960) is a Venezuelan Roman Catholic archbishop. Pope Francis named him Substitute for the Secretariat of State on 15 August 2018, effective 15 October, making him the highest ranking Venezuelan in the Roman Curia. He joined the diplomatic corps of the Holy See in 1993, serving as Apostolic Nuncio to Pakistan from 2011 to 2015 and to Mozambique from 2015 to 2018. He is the first Venezuelan to serve as an Apostolic Nuncio.

He is fluent in Spanish, Italian, English, French, Portuguese and Serbo-Croatian.

Early years
Edgar Peña Parra was born in Maracaibo, Venezuela, on 6 March 1960 and raised in the El Saladillo neighborhood. He earned a degree in philosophy in 1981 at the seminary of the Diocese of San Cristóbal and then a bachelor's degree in theology at the seminary in Caracas. He was ordained a priest of the Archdiocese of Maracaibo on 23 August 1985 by Archbishop .

In Rome beginning in 1986, he studied diplomacy at the Pontifical Ecclesiastical Academy and in 1993 he earned a degree in canon law at the Pontifical Gregorian University with the thesis: "Los Derechos Humanos en el Sistema Interamericano a la luz del Magisterio Pontifical", which, Crux reports, "has become a reference point for the study of human rights".

Diplomat
Peña Parra joined the diplomatic service of the Holy See on 1 April 1993. He fulfilled assignments in Kenya, Yugoslavia (1997–99), South Africa, Honduras (2002–05), and Mexico (2006–11), with a brief stint in the office of the Holy See's representative to the United Nations in Geneva. In Kenya, he represented the Holy See on housing and environmental issues with agencies of the United Nations. In his last assignment before being promoted to nuncio, Parra worked in the Apostolic Nunciature to Mexico first under Giuseppe Bertello and then Christophe Pierre.

On 8 January 2011, Pope Benedict XVI appointed Parra titular archbishop of Thélepte and gave him the title "Apostolic Nuncio". On 2 February 2011 Pope Benedict XVI appointed him Apostolic Nuncio to Pakistan. He received his episcopal consecration on 5 February 2011 from Pope Benedict XVI, with Cardinals Angelo Sodano and Tarcisio Bertone as co-consecrators.

On 21 February 2015, Pope Francis appointed Peña Parra Apostolic Nuncio to Mozambique. In 2016 he joined the group of mediators trying to restore peace between the government of Mozambique and the opposition political party Renamo.

Substitute for General Affairs
Peña Parra was appointed Substitute for General Affairs of the Secretariat of State on 15 August 2018, effective 15 October. He is the second Latin American to hold that position, following the Argentine  Leonardo Sandri, who was substitute from 2000 to 2007.

Writings

See also
 Holy See – Pakistan relations

Notes

References

External links

1960 births
Living people
Pontifical Ecclesiastical Academy alumni
Pontifical Gregorian University alumni
Roman Catholic titular archbishops
Venezuelan Roman Catholic archbishops
Venezuelan Roman Catholic priests
Apostolic Nuncios to Mozambique
Catholic Church in Pakistan
Apostolic Nuncios to Pakistan
Venezuelan expatriates in Pakistan
Diplomats of the Holy See